William Harbord may refer to:

William Harbord (cricketer) (1908–1992), cricketer for Yorkshire, Oxford University and MCC
William Harbord (politician) (1635–1692), English politician and diplomat
William Harbord, 2nd Baron Suffield (1766–1821), noble and cricketer for MCC
Sir William Harbord, 1st Baronet (died 1770), Norfolk country gentleman and Member of Parliament